Kochchenganan (Kōccengaṇān) Kochengat Cholan or Śengaṇān (also spelt Senganan)() was one of the kings of the Early Cholas mentioned in Sangam literature. The only surviving details about his reign come from the fragmentary poems of Sangam in the Purananuru poems. Today historical accounts of the life of Kochchenganan are often confused with more contemporary accounts.

He is known for building the Jambukeshwarar Temple in present-day Trichy.

Sources 
The only contemporary source available to us on Kochchenganan is the mentions in Sangam poetry. There is one song in Purananuru and the forty verses of Kalavazhi Narpathu by the poet Poygaiyar form the earliest evidence of the king’s life. The references to him in the hymns of Thirugnana Sambanthar and Thirumangai Aazhvaar and Sundaramoorthy Nayanar are from a later period which emphasises the religious side of Kochchenganan.

Kochchenganan also figures in the legendary genealogy of the Chola copper-plate inscriptions of the tenth and eleventh centuries. The legend of a spider turning into the Chola monarch is the version found in the later texts as well as in the Periyapuranam, the great compendium of the Shaiva saints.

Sangam literature as a reliable source

The period covered by the extant literature of the Sangam is unfortunately not easy to determine with any measure of certainty. Except the longer epics Silappatikaram and Manimekalai, which by common consent belong to the age later than the Sangam age, the poems have reached us in the forms of systematic anthologies. Each individual poem has generally attached to it a colophon on the authorship and subject matter of the poem, the name of the king or chieftain to whom the poem relates and the occasion which called forth the eulogy are also found.

It is from these colophons and rarely from the texts of the poems themselves, that we gather the names of many kings and chieftains and the poets patronised by them. The task of reducing these names to an ordered scheme in which the different generations of contemporaries can be marked off one another has not been easy. To add to the confusions, some historians have even denounced these colophons as later additions and untrustworthy as historical documents.

Any attempt at extracting a systematic chronology and data from these poems should be aware of the casual nature of these poems and the wide difference between the purposes of the anthologist who collected these poems and the historian’s attempts are arriving at a continuous history.

Kalumalam Battle

Kalavazhi Narpathu is a poem giving a description of the battle of Kalumalam, near Karuvur in the Chera country, in which Kochchenganan defeated and made captive the Chera king Kanaikkal Irumporai. The poet Poygaiyar, a friend of the Chera king, placated Kochchenganan by singing his valour on the battle field in his poem and secured the release of his friend.

The Chera king was suffering from thirst after being deprived of water by Kochchenganan and the poet Poigayar pleaded with the king to allow his friend a drink of water. The Chera felt disgraced by the Chola king and declined the water belatedly offered to him.

The solitary poem from Purananuru supposedly composed by the Chera king while still in captivity, and forms a sad confession of his cowardice in surviving the disgrace that had befallen him (Purananuru – 74).

Religious Persuasion

Although there is no contemporary evidence bearing on Kochchenganan's religious persuasion, there seems little reason to suspect the crux of the later legends on his devotion towards Siva. These legends maintain that the Chola king built 70 Siva temples in his realm.

As a Saiva Saint

The Periyapuranam detailing the stories of the 63 Nayanmars of Shaivism, gives the following story regarding Kochchenganan:

 In a fruit grove in the Chola country, there was a Siva Lingam under a Jambul tree. A white elephant used to come there daily and worship the Lingam. A spider, which was also devoted to Siva, noticed that dry leaves were falling on the God and to prevent this wove a web above the Lingam.

The next day when the elephant came to worship, he found the web, and, thinking that someone had polluted the place, tore the web, offered his worship and went away. The spider came upon the scene, felt sorry that his web had been destroyed, wove another web and went away. The next day, as the elephant was pulling the web away, the spider, which was present there, gave him a sting: the elephant died of the poison on the spot. The spider, too, was caught in the elephant’s trunk, and perished.

Suba Devan, the Chola king and his wife Kamalavati went to Chidambaram and eagerly prayed to the Lord Nataraja for a son. The Lord granted their wish and caused the spider to be born as the Chola king’s child. Soon Kamalavati conceived the child. The day of delivery arrived. Astrologers foretold that if the child could be delivered a few minutes later, it would rule the three worlds! The queen asked that she should be tied to the roof of the room upside down, with a tight bandage around her waist. When the auspicious time came, she was released and the child was born. This was the spider reborn! The child had red eyes as he had remained in his mother’s womb a little longer. The mother, looking into his eyes, said: ‘Kochekannano’ (the child with red eyes), and expired. Hence, he was named Kochengat Cholan. When he reached the proper age, his father enthroned him king.

Kochengannan used to darshan (worship) Ayyaarappan (Pancha nadheeshwar-Thiruvaiyaaru) everyday in the morning. But one time, due to more water flow in river Kaviri he couldn't cross the river. So, he was sad. At that time the pulikaal munivar (Viyaakra paathar) appeared there and asked him to build a Temple for Ayyaarappan. The Temple was built in the small town Kurumbalur (in Perambalur taluk). The Shiva name in the temple is same 'Pancha nadheeswar' means ayyaarappan in Tamil.

Thiruvanaikaval Temple

Thiruvanaikaval (also Thiruvanaikal) is a famous Shiva temple in Tiruchirapalli (Trichy). The temple was built by Kochchenganan. Also Kailayanathar temple in Nagapattinam was built by him.

See also
 Early Cholas
 Legendary early Chola kings

Notes

References 
 Mudaliar, A.S, Abithana Chintamani (1931), Reprinted 1984 Asian Educational Services, New Delhi.
 Nilakanta Sastri, K.A. (1935). The CōĻas, University of Madras, Madras (Reprinted 1984).
 Nilakanta Sastri, K.A. (1955). A History of South India, OUP, New Delhi (Reprinted 2002).
 
 

Chola kings
Nayanars